James MacDonough (born April 3, 1970) is an American bass guitarist. He has played with heavy metal bands Iced Earth, Nevermore, and Megadeth.

Career 

MacDonough was part of Iced Earth's line up from 1996–2000 and again from 2001–2004. With Iced Earth he recorded: 3 full-length albums, an EP, a live album, and a single. In late 2004, he was recruited into Megadeth. James toured with Dave Mustaine and the band for almost 2 years, appearing with Megadeth on the first ever Gigantour festival, the brainchild of Mustaine. He appears in Megadeth's music video for the song "Of Mice and Men", the Arsenal of Megadeth DVD, and (in cartoon form) the band's cameo in an episode of Duck Dodgers. He never recorded a studio album with Megadeth.

On February 10, 2006, James posted a message on the Megadeth forums saying he was parting ways with Megadeth. The forum post MacDonough made was entitled "Hello Droogs" and contained the following:

The next day Megadeth frontman Dave Mustaine posted in the forums saying he had nothing bad to say about James and that he hopes they remain friends.

On April 25, 2006, Blabbermouth.net reported that James would fill in for Nevermore bass player Jim Sheppard as he underwent treatment for Crohn's disease. James is a long-time fan and friend of the band (on his Megadeth.com bio, he stated Nevermore's Enemies of Reality as one of his favorite albums) and performed with them on their tour with In Flames in the mid part of 2006.

It was then announced on July 25 that James would fill in for Strapping Young Lad bassist, Byron Stroud on the end of the Ozzfest tour, as Byron had to return to Fear Factory for European festival dates.

Bands 
Iced Earth 1996–2000, 2001–2004
Megadeth 2004–2006

Discography

Iced Earth 
 Days of Purgatory – 1997
 Something Wicked This Way Comes – 1998
 The Melancholy E.P. (Limited Edition) – 1999
 Alive in Athens – 1999
 The Melancholy E.P. – 2001
 Dark Genesis – 2001
 Tribute to the Gods – 2002
 The Reckoning – 2003
 The Glorious Burden – 2004

Megadeth 
 Arsenal of Megadeth (DVD) – 2006
 Gigantour (CD & DVD) – 2006
 That One Night: Live in Buenos Aires (CD & DVD) – 2007

References

External links 

1970 births
Living people
American heavy metal bass guitarists
American male bass guitarists
Megadeth members
Musicians from Jacksonville, Florida
Iced Earth members
Guitarists from Florida
American male guitarists
21st-century American bass guitarists